Idaea mediaria is a moth of the family Geometridae. It is found in south-western Europe, Corsica, Sardinia, Tuscany and North Africa.

The adults fly from July to September. .

The larvae feed on various herbaceous plants.

Notes
The flight season refers to France. This may vary in other parts of the range.

External links

Fauna Europaea
Lepiforum.de

Sterrhini
Moths of Europe
Moths of Africa
Moths described in 1896
Taxa named by Jacob Hübner